The Texas Rangers 1982 season involved the Rangers finishing 6th in the American League West with a record of 64 wins and 98 losses.

Offseason 
 December 11, 1981: Jim Kern was traded by the Rangers to the New York Mets for Doug Flynn and Dan Boitano.
January 12, 1982: Scott Bailes was drafted by the Texas Rangers in the 7th round of the 1982 amateur draft, but did not sign. 
 March 26, 1982: Bump Wills was traded by the Rangers to the Chicago Cubs for Paul Mirabella, a player to be named later, and cash. The Cubs completed the trade by sending Paul Semall (minors) to the Rangers on April 21.
 March 31, 1982: Al Oliver was traded by the Rangers to the Montreal Expos for Larry Parrish and Dave Hostetler.

Regular season 
 July 10, 1982: Larry Parrish hit his third grand slam of the week for the Rangers.

Season standings

Record vs. opponents

Notable transactions 
 April 1, 1982: Nelson Norman was traded by the Rangers to the Pittsburgh Pirates for Víctor Cruz.
 April 1, 1982: Ron Darling and Walt Terrell were traded by the Rangers to the New York Mets for Lee Mazzilli.
 June 7, 1982: Randy Kramer was drafted by the Rangers in the 1st round (10th pick) of the 1982 Major League Baseball Draft (Secondary Phase).
 August 8, 1982: Lee Mazzilli was traded by the Rangers to the New York Yankees for Bucky Dent.

Roster

Player stats

Batting

Starters by position 
Note: Pos = Position; G = Games played; AB = At bats; H = Hits; Avg. = Batting average; HR = Home runs; RBI = Runs batted in

Other batters 
Note: G = Games played; AB = At bats; H = Hits; Avg. = Batting average; HR = Home runs; RBI = Runs batted in

Pitching

Starting pitchers 
Note: G = Games pitched; IP = Innings pitched; W = Wins; L = Losses; ERA = Earned run average; SO = Strikeouts

Other pitchers 
Note: G = Games pitched; IP = Innings pitched; W = Wins; L = Losses; ERA = Earned run average; SO = Strikeouts

Relief pitchers 
Note: G = Games pitched; W = Wins; L = Losses; SV = Saves; ERA = Earned run average; SO = Strikeouts

Awards and honors 
Buddy Bell, 3B, Gold Glove 1982
All-Star Game

Farm system 

LEAGUE CHAMPIONS: Tulsa

Notes

References 
1982 Texas Rangers team page at Baseball Reference
1982 Texas Rangers team page at www.baseball-almanac.com

Texas Rangers seasons
Texas Rangers season
Texas Rang